Augustine A. Healy (20 May 1904 – 10 July 1987) was an Irish Fianna Fáil politician. A dental laboratory proprietor, Healy was first elected to Dáil Éireann as a Fianna Fáil Teachta Dála (TD) for the Cork Borough constituency at the 1957 general election but lost his seat at the 1961 general election, and was instead nominated by the Taoiseach Seán Lemass to the 10th Seanad. Healy regained his Dáil seat at the 1965 general election and, later representing Cork City South-East, retained his seat until retiring at the 1977 general election.

Commonly known Gus Healy, he served as Lord Mayor of Cork from 1964 to 1965 and from 1975 to 1976.

Healy was a keen amateur swimmer and a member of Sunday's Well Swimming Club. He continued to promote the sport during his mayoralty and in the 1970s the city's first suburban swimming pool at Douglas was named the Gus Healy municipal swimming pool.

References

 

1904 births
1987 deaths
Fianna Fáil TDs
Members of the 16th Dáil
Members of the 10th Seanad
Members of the 18th Dáil
Members of the 19th Dáil
Members of the 20th Dáil
Local councillors in Cork (city)
Lord Mayors of Cork
Nominated members of Seanad Éireann
Fianna Fáil senators